Daniel Zehender (died 15 September 1500) was a Roman Catholic prelate who served as Bishop of Konstanz (1473–1500).

Biography
Daniel Zehender was ordained a priest in the Order of Friars Minor. On 3 December 1473 he was appointed during the papacy of Pope Sixtus IV as Auxiliary Bishop of Konstanz and Titular Bishop of Belline. On 19 December 1473 he was consecrated bishop by Šimun Vosić, Bishop of Capodistria, with Giacomo, Bishop of Sant'Angelo dei Lombardi, serving as co-consecrators. He served as Auxiliary Bishop of Konstanz until his death on 15 September 1500. While bishop, he was the principal co-consecrator of Gaspard de Reno, Bishop of Basel (1479), and of Friedrich von Hohenzollern, Bishop of Augsburg (1486).

References 

15th-century German Roman Catholic bishops
Bishops appointed by Pope Sixtus IV
1500 deaths
Franciscan bishops